Macuna, also known as Buhagana, Wahana, is a Tucanoan language of Colombia and Brazil.

References

Languages of Colombia
Tucanoan languages